Clithon oualaniense is a species of brackish water snail with an operculum, a nerite. It is an aquatic gastropod mollusk in the family Neritidae, the nerites.

Distribution 
This species occurs in Indo-Pacific region: Nansei-shoto in Japan, Hong Kong, Thailand, Peninsular Malaysia, Singapore, Jawa in Indonesia, Philippines, Papua New Guinea, Queensland in Australia India and Ceylon. It also occurs in American Samoa, Cook Islands, Fiji, French Polynesia, Guam, New Caledonia, Samoa, Solomon Islands and Vanuatu.

Description
The coloration pattern on the shell is very variable.

Ecology

Clithon oualaniense is a eurybiotic species. It inhabits soft bottoms of intertidal habitats. It can occur in high density, for example 347 snails per m² was recorded, that correspond to the biomass of 30.6 g per m². It also inhabits sea grass bed with Zostera japonica. The activity of Clithon oualaniense is diurnal; snails are active during the daytime and inactive at night. It bury itself into the mud, when the tide is high, probably to avoid water predators. They are on the surface feeding and mating when the tide is low.

Clithon oualaniense is herbivorous, feeding of microalgae and on detritus.

References

External links 

 Budiman A. (1988). "Aspect of ecology of Clithon oualaniensis (Gastropoda: Neritidae) on Sonneratia pioneer zone at Sosobok River, Kao Bay, Halmahera". In: Biological Systems of Mangroves, a Report of East Indonesian Mangrove Expedition, 1986. eds. K Ogino & M Chihara, Ehime University, 59-65.
 https://archive.org/stream/systematischesco210mart#page/192/mode/2up/

Neritidae
Gastropods described in 1831
Taxa named by René Lesson